Diamond Life is the debut studio album by English band Sade, released in the United Kingdom on 16 July 1984 by Epic Records and in the United States on 27 February 1985 by Portrait Records. After studying fashion design, and later modelling, Sade Adu began backup-singing with British band Pride. During this time Adu and three of the original members of "Pride"—Paul Anthony Cook, Paul Denman and Stuart Matthewman—left the group to form their own band called Sade. After various demos and performances, Sade received interest from record labels and signed to Epic.

Recording for the album began in 1983 at Power Plant Studios in London and took six weeks to complete. The album's content was written by the group Sade and the production was handled by Robin Millar. Fifteen songs were recorded. The album contained a variety of musical elements including soul, jazz and sophisti-pop, mostly with love lyrics. The album spawned four singles, including "Your Love Is King" and "Smooth Operator".

Diamond Life received widespread acclaim from music critics and it was also a commercial success, winning the 1985 Brit Award for Best British Album. The album reached number two on the UK Albums Chart and number five on the US Billboard 200, and has been certified multi-platinum in both countries. Diamond Life sold over 10 million copies worldwide, becoming one of the top-selling debut recordings of the era and the best-selling debut album by a British female vocalist, a record that stood for 24 years.

Background
After studying fashion design, and later modeling briefly, Sade began backup singing with British band Pride, during this time she formed a songwriting partnership with Pride's guitarist/saxophonist Stewart Matthewman; together, backed by Pride's rhythm section Paul Anthony Cook and Paul Denman, they began doing their own sets at Pride gigs. Her solo performances of the song "Smooth Operator" attracted the attention of record companies, and in 1983, Adu and Matthewman, split from Pride, along with bassist Paul Denman and drummer Paul Anthony Cook to form the band Sade. In May 1983, Sade performed for the first time in the United States, at Danceteria Club in New York. On 18 October 1983 Sade Adu signed with Epic Records, while the rest of the band signed to her as contractors in 1984.

Recording
Prior to signing the record deal, the group recorded Diamond Life in six weeks. It was recorded at Power Plant Studios in London. After cutting the proposed singles "Smooth Operator" and "Your Love Is King", the first album track recorded was "Sally", a song about the Salvation Army. During recording the band worked collectively on the musical direction, rehearsing each song in detail and then recording it. The song "When Am I Going to Make a Living" was started by Sade on the back of a cleaning ticket after she picked her clothes up from the cleaners. She had no money and she wrote down, "When Am I Going to Make a Living".

Producer Robin Millar met the band in 1983, and the band members had never worked in a professional studio and only had demos and recordings from the BBC studios and EMI publishing studios. Millar booked a week's worth of studio time and noted that the limitations of recording before computers had an impact upon the sound. "We used a real piano and a Fender Rhodes piano, painstakingly synching them up." They recorded 15 songs, all written by Adu and members of the group, except "Smooth Operator" written exclusively by Adu and Ray St. John. They also recorded a cover version of "Why Can't We Live Together" (1972) by Timmy Thomas.

For the recording of "Cherry Pie", the band had no mixing desks with automation; each member had their job of putting a bit of echo, delay, or changing a level. Millar would then edit between the different mixes. Speaking about this Stuart Matthewman said, "Very often, we would have six people at the mixing desk at the same time."

Content
Lyrically, the album revolves around themes of love, discussing both the positives and the negatives of relationships; the music features jazzy textures, built over prominent basslines, smooth drums and subtle guitar. The album also features heavy use of brass instruments and keyboards.
According to Paul Lester of BBC Music, the album is "sufficiently soulful and jazzy yet poppy, funky and easy listening", Lester described the album is being predominantly a quiet storm album with elements of mellifluous R&B. Sade's vocals on the album were described as "deliberately icy, her delivery and voice aloof, deadpan, and cold" while Ron Wynn of AllMusic stated that the album contained "slick production and quasi-jazz backing".

In a contemporary review, Stephen Holden of The New York Times said Diamond Life "eschews the synthesizers that dominate British pop to make music that resembles a cross between the rock-jazz of Steely Dan and the West Indian-flavored folk-pop of Joan Armatrading. Smoldering Brazilian rhythms blend with terse pop-soul melodies and jazzy harmonies to create a sultry, timeless nightclub ambiance." Rolling Stone called it soul music with "self-possessed sophistication", and described Sade's vocal as "thick and rich".

The album opens with the single "Smooth Operator", musically song cross between R&B, jazz, adult contemporary, pop and dance music over a light production. The song contains a Latin-style percussion and lusty saxophone and features lyrics about an "international playboy".
"Your Love Is King" is a dynamic smooth ballad, that contains wrenching vocals performed by Sade and saxophone solo by Stuart Matthewman. The following song on the album is the uptempo track "Hang On to Your Love", which contains a thumping groove and lyrics that revolve around someone holding on to a relationship when things are going bad. "Sally" is a haunting laid-back, bluesy ballad that was compared to the work of Billie Holiday. The album closes with cover version of Timmy Thomas' 1972 song "Why Can't We Live Together".

Release and promotion
"Your Love Is King" was released as the album's lead single on 25 February 1984, the song was a success in European territories charting at number seven in Ireland and number six on the UK Singles Chart. The song was less successful in the United States, where it peaked at number 54 on the Billboard Hot 100.
"When Am I Going to Make a Living" was released as the album's second single in the UK on 26 May 1984, the single was less successful than its predecessor charting at number 28 on the Irish Singles Chart and number 36 on the UK Singles Chart. However, the song did fare well elsewhere peaking at number 12 on the Dutch Top 40.

"Smooth Operator" was released on 15 September 1984 as the album's third single. It peaked at number 19 in the UK, while reaching the top 20 in Austria, Switzerland, France and Germany. In the United States, the song peaked at number five on the Billboard Hot 100 and Billboard Hot Black Singles chart, as well as topping the Billboard Adult Contemporary chart.

Critical reception

In a contemporary review for The Village Voice, Robert Christgau applauded Sade's "taste, concept, sound", and avoidance of indulgent musicianship, arguing that these qualities enhanced the "humanitarian" themed songs. The range of both the singer's "grainy voice" and "well-meaning songwriting" was questioned by Christgau, who found "Hang On to Your Love" and "Smooth Operator" more "warming" than "seductive" and incapable of sustaining the rest of the album. Lynn Van Matre from the Chicago Tribune deemed the record "casual cocktail-lounge elegance", performed "with far more style than substance". Connie Johnson of the Los Angeles Times said "there's an earthy substance to some of the cuts—not much substance, but enough to draw you back for another listen", while crediting Sade for knowing how to "clamp personal style onto recycled R&B idioms and make it all look invitingly new". Paul Lester was more enthusiastic in a retrospective review for BBC Music, crediting Sade for her ability to write "songs that were sufficiently soulful and jazzy yet poppy, funky yet easy listening, to appeal to fans of all those genres". Paul Evans called Diamond Life a "victory of attitude" in The Rolling Stone Album Guide (1992), writing that Sade "projects a wised-up sensuality, and the record neither creaks with the revivalism of Harry Connick nor the sterility of Simply Red, to name but two of Sade's neo-cocktail rivals."

The album won the 1985 Brit Award for Best British Album. It was also among 10 albums nominated for British Album of 30 Years at the 2010 Brit Awards, losing to (What's the Story) Morning Glory? by Oasis. The music video for "Smooth Operator", directed by Julien Temple, was nominated for two MTV Video Music Awards in 1985, Best Female Video and Best New Artist. Diamond Life was voted the 14th best album of the year in the 1985 Pazz & Jop, an annual poll of American critics, published by The Village Voice; "Smooth Operator" was voted 25th in the singles poll. Pitchfork placed the album at number 10 on its list of "The 200 Best Albums of the 1980s". In 2020, Rolling Stone ranked the album number 200 on its list of "The 500 Greatest Albums of All Time" and, in 2022, number 66 on its list of "100 Best Debut Albums of All Time".

Commercial performance
Diamond Life reached number two in the UK Album Chart and was certified quadruple platinum by the British Phonographic Industry (BPI) on 2 March 1987, denoting shipments in excess of 1.2 million copies in the United Kingdom. In the United States, it peaked at number five on the Billboard 200, and on 2 February 1995, it was certified quadruple platinum by the Recording Industry Association of America (RIAA) for shipments in excess of four million copies. Additionally, the album topped the charts in Austria, France, Germany, the Netherlands, New Zealand and Switzerland. By May 1985, Diamond Life had international sales of over one million copies in the United Kingdom, and four million copies sold worldwide. As of November 1997, worldwide sales stand at 10 million copies.

Legacy
Sade and the band were credited as being influential to neo soul. The band achieved success in the 1980s with music that featured a sophisti-pop style, incorporating elements of soul, pop, smooth jazz, and quiet storm. Lester credited the album with giving quiet storm music a "wide, even international audience". The band was part of a new wave of British R&B-oriented artists during the late 1980s and early 1990s that also included Soul II Soul, Caron Wheeler, The Brand New Heavies, Simply Red, Jamiroquai, and Lisa Stansfield. AllMusic's Alex Henderson wrote, "Many of the British artists who emerged during that period had a neo-soul outlook and were able to blend influences from different eras". Following the coining of the term "quiet storm" by Smokey Robinson, Sade was credited for helping give the genre a worldwide audience.

Track listing

Some cassette editions, like the initial US and Canadian editions, use the above standard track listing. Others used the track listing below, which included "Smooth Operator" / "Snake Bite" and "Love Affair with Life" from the single for "Your Love Is King".

Personnel
Credits adapted from the liner notes of Diamond Life.

Sade
 Sade Adu – vocals
 Stuart Matthewman – saxophone, guitar
 Andrew Hale – keyboards
 Paul S. Denman – bass

Additional musicians
 Dave Early – drums, percussion
 Martin Ditcham – percussion
 Paul Cooke – drums
 Terry Bailey – trumpet
 Gordon Matthewman – trumpet

Technical
 Robin Millar – production
 Mike Pela – production engineering
 Ben Rogan – engineering

Artwork
 Chris Roberts – photos
 Graham Smith – sleeve design

Charts

Weekly charts

Year-end charts

Certifications and sales

See also
 List of European number-one hits of 1985

References

Bibliography

 

1984 debut albums
Albums produced by Robin Millar
Albums recorded at Morgan Sound Studios
Brit Award for British Album of the Year
Epic Records albums
Portrait Records albums
Sade (band) albums